Operation Samurra was an operation by the Iraqi Air Force (IQAF) during the Gulf War to decisively engage McDonnell Douglas F-15C Eagle fighters from the United States Air Force (USAF) using Mikoyan-Gurevich MiG-25 interceptors, and break the "wall" of F-15s that the Coalition had established along Iraq's border with Iran. It demonstrated the last true offensive operation of the IQAF before grounding their air assets in an attempt to preserve them for future use. Through careful planning and coordination, two MiG-25 jets successfully caught two USAF F-15 fighters off guard and engaged them in a dogfight. After several minutes of aerial maneuvering and several fired missiles, the Iraqi jets returned to Tammuz Air Base undamaged, and the F-15s returned to Saudi Arabia, albeit with one damaged.

Prelude
By January 19, 1991 it had become apparent to Iraqi leadership that they could not engage Coalition air forces openly. Iraqi president Saddam Hussein had ordered most of his air assets to be conserved inside of bunkers in an attempt to save them for future use against the Coalition. Consequently, Coalition sorties began targeting aircraft hangars and shelters to destroy the Iraqi Air Force on the ground. Between 17 and 27 January, 117 Iraqi aircraft were destroyed on the ground. Saddam ordered his air force to evacuate their aircraft to neighbouring Iran temporarily, to be used in future sorties (Iran instead interned the aircraft).

Flying in flights of four, Iraqi military aircraft retreated east across the country, routed through Baghdad airspace due to its heavy air defenses. To counter this, the USAF established a "wall" of F-15s along the Iranian border to shoot down any aircraft attempting to flee. In order to facilitate the retreat of its air force, Iraq sought to shoot down these patrolling F-15s.

Plan
Planning for Operation Samurra had begun as early as 18 January, when the IQAF was bolstered by a successful operation the night before whereupon they intercepted several USAF EF-111 Ravens that were jamming Iraqi radars. Subsequently, Iraqi anti-aircraft gunners were able to wreak havoc on a now unprotected sortie of F-15E Strike Eagle bombers.

The plan involved having two MiG-25 aircraft from different directions vectored onto an isolated group of F-15s. If the F-15s tried to attack one of the MiGs, the other would be in a flanking position which would enable it to down the F-15s more easily. Iraq didn't evacuate their MiG-25 "Foxbats" in order to retain them for this mission.  Monitoring Coalition AWACS and F-15 radio frequencies, Iraqi forces waited for the proper situation to begin the operation.

Battle
Finally on January 30, an Iraqi intelligence unit intercepted communications that one of the patrols, "Xerex 31" was approaching "bingo fuel" which necessitated an hour and a half round trip to an aerial tanker. This left just two F-15 jets, "Xerex 33" piloted by USAF Capt. Thomas Dietz, and another by 1st Lt. Robert Hehemann, in the area. Recognizing the opportunity, two MiG-25s were scrambled from two separate air bases. Capt. Mahmoud Awad took off from Qadessiya Air Base, while Capt. Mohammed Jassi as-Sammarai took off from Tammuz Air Base. After engaging a false target, both pilots were directed to Dietz and Hehemann by Iraqi air traffic control.

The two flights immediately engaged one another, with Hehemann firing two missiles, one of which was a dud. At the same time, as-Sammarai achieved radar lock on Hehemann and fired an R-40 missile, which went ballistic after as-Sammarai was forced into evasive maneuvers to avoid Hehemann's missile. As-Sammarai's missile damaged Hehemann's left engine, but his F-15 remained flyable. Meanwhile, Dietz engaged Awad, attempting to fire several missiles at him. After Dietz's missiles failed to fire three times, Awad managed to get radar lock on Dietz's F-15, putting him onto the defensive. Dietz attempted to disengage, heading east. Hehemann, still engaged with as-Sammarai, fired another missile, and then found himself under lock-on by the now unoccupied Awad. Hehemann avoided Awad's missile with the use of chaff and flares. As-Sammarai and Awad then disengaged to the west in full afterburner, back towards Tammuz Air Base.

At the same time, "Xerex 31" was returning from the aerial tanker and had been monitoring the air battle. Pilots Lt. Col. Randy Bigum and 1st Lt. Lynn Broome decided to direct their F-15s in an attempt to intercept the two MiG-25s. However, a high altitude crosswind forced them over Baghdad, which was the most heavily defended airspace in Iraq. The two were subsequently locked-on by Iraqi gunners. Bigum would later admit he didn't notice the drift because he and his wing-man were determined to score a MiG kill. Despite this, they still managed to achieve radar lock up on both as-Sammarai and Awad, and each fired a missile at them. Both missed. Bigum fired a second missile at Awad, but Awad landed his aircraft before the missile arrived. Bigum and Broome egressed the area before they could be shot down by surface-to-air missiles, which were still targeting them.

Result
The Iraqi Air Force first credited as-Sammarai with a "possible" victory which was later upgraded to "confirmed" after a Bedouin smuggler discovered wreckage of an F-15 just inside Saudi Arabia, very close to where Iraqi radars had allegedly lost track of a falling F-15 on January 30. Later Iraqi government documents claim two F-15s recorded as being shot down in this engagement. However, the USAF states that there is no record of an F-15 being shot down on January 30 in the area west of Baghdad. Nonetheless, this is probably the closest an F-15 has ever come to being shot down in air-to-air combat.

Operation Samurra was the last offensive operation of the Iraqi Air Force during the Gulf War. By mid-February all IQAF activity had effectively ceased as the Coalition completed their dominance over the skies, and not a single offensive sortie was even attempted during the ground phase of the war. Most of the MiG-25's in Iraq's arsenal survived the war, and went on to serve until the 2003 invasion of Iraq when they were buried, by which time they remained in various states of airworthiness.

Dietz and Hehemann would go on to be the highest scoring fighter pilots of the Gulf War, with three air-to-air kills apiece by the war's end. Bigum and Broome finished the war with no  kills.

See also
 Air engagements of the Gulf War
 List of Gulf War pilots by victories

References

Sources

Air-to-air combat operations and battles
Aerial operations and battles of the Gulf War
January 1991 events in Asia